Neferkare VII was the third pharaoh of the Ninth Dynasty of Egypt of ancient Egypt, ca. 2140 BCE (during the First Intermediate Period), according to the Turin King List where his name, Neferkare, is inscribed in the register 4.20.

Neferkare is not included on the Abydos King List or the Saqqara King List, nor can the existence of his reign be positively confirmed through archaeological finds.

The prenomen "Neferkare" suggests he considered himself a legitimate successor of Pepi II Neferkare of the Sixth Dynasty, much like the many namesake Memphite kings of the Eighth Dynasty. In some literature he is called "Neferkare VII" because he likely was the seventh king to bear this name, although many of his predecessors are now called by a combination of their prenomen and nomen (for example, Neferkare Neby, or Neferkare Pepiseneb).

If Neferkare and Kaneferre were the same pharaoh, his authority is sometimes presumed from Ankhtifi's inscription to have extended at least over Elephantine, Edfu and Hieraconpolis, the capitals of the first three nomoi of Upper Egypt. However, the inscription in question simply states "Horus brings/brought (or may Horus bring) a (good) inundation for his son Ka-nefer-Re." Uncertainty about the verb tense in the inscription has led to disagreement among various scholars as to whether this named pharaoh would have ruled in Ankhtifi's youth, or at the time of the events he describes, or indeed if it were not a king before Ankhtifi's time, who had ruled toward the end of the Old Kingdom from Memphis.

References

22nd-century BC Pharaohs
Pharaohs of the Ninth Dynasty of Egypt